Daniel Martín Alexandre (born 16 September 1981), commonly known as Dani, is a Spanish retired footballer who played as a striker.

His career was closely associated to Betis, for which he appeared in 115 competitive games (26 goals) and won one Copa del Rey.

Club career
Born in Seville, Dani started playing professionally with his hometown club Real Betis, and appeared for its B-side during three years, a spell which included six goals in 27 games in 1999–2000. On 4 November 2001 he made his first-team – and La Liga – debut, playing the second half of a 0–1 home loss against Real Zaragoza and finishing the season with 17 games and five goals.

After having missed most of the 2002–03 campaign due to a serious knee injury, occurred in April 2002 and relapsed in August, Dani was knocked unconscious during a league game against Deportivo de La Coruña in November 2003, and was unable to remember a disallowed goal he had scored during the game. However, he continued to grab important goals for the Andalusians with relatively little playing time, most notably the extra time winner in the 2005 final of the Copa del Rey against CA Osasuna, adding the game's only goal in a 1–0 home win against Chelsea in the 2005–06 UEFA Champions League group stage; on 20 August 2005, he also netted a brace at the Camp Nou to help defeat FC Barcelona 2–1 in the Supercopa de España, but the Catalans had already won the first leg 3–0.

On 18 January 2007, Dani netted against Real Madrid, eliminating the eventual league champions from domestic cup contention. His equalising goal gave Betis a 1–1 draw, putting them through to the quarter-finals on the away goals rule, and he finished the league with only 14 appearances, not being able to find the net.

Under Betis contract until 2010, Dani would however join Segunda División club Cádiz CF, also in the region, in a one-year loan deal including the possibility of definitive purchase at the end of the term. With his ten goals the team could not, however, avoid relegation.

Dani stayed in the division for the following season, being again loaned, this time to Alicante side Elche CF, also in the second tier. His stint was marred by injuries and dramatic loss of form, as he only managed to score once in official games and only appeared in one third of the matches.

Returning to Betis in July, Dani immediately underwent a knee operation, only being made available in January 2010. However, he was one of the club's last attacking options and, late in the month, signed a one-and-a-half-year deal with division two's Recreativo de Huelva.

On 6 February 2011, Dani scored the game's only goal as Recreativo defeated Betis at the Estadio Benito Villamarín. He retired in 2013 at the age of 32, after spells in his country's Segunda División B and Greece.

References

External links

Betisweb stats and bio 

1981 births
Living people
Footballers from Seville
Spanish footballers
Association football forwards
La Liga players
Segunda División players
Segunda División B players
Tercera División players
Betis Deportivo Balompié footballers
Real Betis players
Cádiz CF players
Elche CF players
Recreativo de Huelva players
CD Atlético Baleares footballers
Football League (Greece) players
Pierikos F.C. players
Spain youth international footballers
Spain under-21 international footballers
Spanish expatriate footballers
Expatriate footballers in Greece